Trace amine associated receptor 6, also known as TAAR6, is a protein which in humans is encoded by the TAAR6 gene.

Function 

TAAR6 belongs to the trace amine-associated receptor family. Trace amines are endogenous amine compounds that are chemically similar to classic biogenic amines like dopamine, norepinephrine, serotonin, and histamine. Trace amines were thought to be 'false transmitters' that displace classic biogenic amines from their storage and act on transporters in a fashion similar to the amphetamines, but the identification of brain receptors specific to trace amines indicates that they also have effects of their own.  RNA expression analysis shows hTTAR6 is expressed in the hippocampus, where murine TAAR receptors have been shown to be involved with neurogenesis.

Computational modeling suggests TAAR6 can bind to the foul smelling compounds produced by rotting flesh, putrescine and cadaverine.
  
TAAR6 mutant mice have differences in behavior compared with wild-type mice. Also, they have elevated brain serotonin levels in several brain regions and enhanced hypothermic response to 5-HT1A receptor agonist 8-OH-DPAT.

References

Further reading 

 
 
 
 
 
 

G protein-coupled receptors